The Ashland Bridge in Ashland, Nebraska, also known as Silver Street Bridge, is a pony truss bridge that was built in 1936.  It was listed on the National Register of Historic Places in 1992, and was delisted in 2023.

At the time of its listing, it was notable as one of just two surviving Warren truss bridges in Nebraska.

References

Road bridges on the National Register of Historic Places in Nebraska
Bridges completed in 1936
Buildings and structures in Saunders County, Nebraska
National Register of Historic Places in Saunders County, Nebraska
Warren truss bridges in the United States
Former National Register of Historic Places in Nebraska